Giuseppe Vasi (27 August 1710 – 16 April 1782) was an Italian engraver and architect, best known for his vedute.

Biography
He was born in Corleone, Sicily and later, around 1736, moved to Rome. After a period of intense visits and studies, Vasi started to work as an engraver in the Calcografia Camerale, the main public institution of Rome devoted to engraving and etching, founded some years before by Pope Clement XII. His views for the Calcografia include panoramas of the Trevi Fountain and of the Spanish Steps. 

Later on Vasi started to work on his own, producing and selling series of his views to a public made principally of grand tourists. The first series of akin consists in the Vedute di Roma sul Tevere, i.e. Views of the Tiber, circa 1743 and later adapted to become part of the Magnificenze di Roma antica e moderna. In these years Vasi also hosted in his workshop for a limited period of time the young Giovanni Battista Piranesi, his major pupil, who shaped here his technique as an engraver. 

From 1747 to 1761 Vasi published a series of ten volumes including circa 240 engravings of vedute of Rome. He also created 15 tablet engravings of opera scenes designed by Vincenzo Re; some of which are part of the collection at the Victoria and Albert Museum in London.  

Vasi played a major role as a cartographer and as writer as well. As a cartographer his major work remains the giant map of Rome, published in the early 1760s but conceived at least 20 years before; as an author, Vasi wrote nine out of ten books of the "Magnificenze" (II to X) and the "Itinerario Istruttivo". The "Itinerario", first published in the 1760s as well, turned out to be one of the most successful enterprises akin: translated in French and later in English, it was re-edited, modified and republished up to the mid-18th century.

State of the art
Vasi was a famous man and artist up to the 1760s, when Piranesi took definitively his place, making his master's style old and outdated. For over 200 years Vasi was artistically forgotten and his views taken into account only for their topographical and documentary qualities. Things changed in 1981, thanks to the monograph by Luisa Scalabroni and even more in the nineties, mainly thanks to the contributions by Paolo Coen on his catalogue and by Allan Ceen on the maps. Today Giuseppe Vasi is no longer considered Piranesi's defeated rival, but an artist with his own personality and technique. Though far from being a revolutionary, he gave a significant contribution to the Roman school of engraving applied to the "veduta", with a role quite similar to Giovanni Panini's in painting.

Works (selected)

Selected modern bibliography
 L. Scalabroni, Giuseppe Vasi, Rome, Multigrafica, 1981
 P. Coen, Le Magnificenze di Roma di Giuseppe Vasi, Rome, Newton and Compton, 1996, II ed. 2006
 P. Coen, Arte, cultura e mercato in una bottega romana del XVIII secolo: l'impresa calcografica di Giuseppe e Mariano Vasi, fra continuità e rinnovamento", in "Bollettino d'arte", n. 115, 2001
 Imago Urbis: Giuseppe Vasi's Grand Tour of Rome, University of Oregon, 2008
 James G. Harper & James T. Tice, Giuseppe Vasi's Rome: Lasting Impressions from the Age of the Grand Tour, exh. cat., Jordan Schnitzer Museum of Art & the Princeton University Art Museum 2010 (distributed by the University of Delaware Press), 2010

External links

Baroque Rome in the etchings of Gudi Vasi
Resource offering high-res images
University of Oregon's Imago Urbis: Giuseppe Vasi’s Grand Tour of Rome 

1710 births
1782 deaths
People from Corleone
Italian engravers
Artists from the Province of Palermo
Landscape artists
Italian vedutisti